Yippee, also known as Yippee: A Journey to Jewish Joy, is a 2006 documentary film directed by and starring Paul Mazursky. The film follows Mazursky's journey to a small town in Ukraine, to witness and participate in a three-day festival of over 25,000 singing, dancing, praying, and emotionally elevated Hasidic Jews. It was Mazursky's only documentary.

Yippee made its North American debut at the 2007 Palm Springs International Film Festival.

References

External links 

2006 films
Documentary films about Jews and Judaism
Hasidic Judaism in popular culture
2000s English-language films